The , abbreviated to , is a university that has campuses in Kofu and Chūō, Japan. The University of Yamanashi has its origin in “Kitenkan” which was founded in 1795 as a branch school of “Shoheizaka-School” of Tokugawa Government (later the University of Tokyo) and was developed to the Normal School of Yamanashi after the Meiji Restoration. In 1921 the Normal School of Yamanashi for Junior and in 1924 the Yamanashi High School of Engineering were established. After the World War II these three schools were integrated to the University of Yamanashi according to the new school system of Japan. In 1978 the Yamanashi Medical University was opened which was only a Medical University in Prefecture of Yamanashi. Today’s University of Yamanashi was founded in 2002 by a merger between (former) University of Yamanashi and Yamanashi Medical University. It is formally referred to as the National University Corporation University of Yamanashi. In 2012 the Faculty of Education and Human science and the Faculty of Engineering were reorganized and the Faculty of Life and Environmental Science was newly established. In 2016 the lifelong studies course in the Faculty of Education and Human science was abolished, and the faculty was renamed to the Faculty of Education.

The university has therefore four faculties: the Faculty of Education Human Sciences, the Faculty of Medicine, the Faculty of Engineering and the Faculty of Life and Environmental Science. It should not be confused with the similarly named Yamanashi Prefectural University.

The University of Yamanashi is located in Kofu, which is the prefectural capital of Yamanashi and is distant about 120 kilometers west from Tokyo. For the University stands in the Center of the Kofu Basin surrounded by many mountains, many students are often engaged in leisure and sports in holidays.

Education
The project of the Faculty of Engineering "Research and Education of Integrated Water Resources Management for the Asian Monsoon Region" was adopted as the 21st Century COE Program of 2002-2006. It has been followed by the Global COE Program "Evolution of Research and Education of integrated River Basin Management in Asian Region" since 2007.

 Kofu Eastern Campus (the Faculty of Technology)
Only this university has the institution for wine (planting and brewing) in Japan. The produced wine is available in the shop in this campus.
Cooperative Research and Development Center
Center for Instrumental Analysis
Universal Information Center
Fuel Cell Nanomaterials Center
Advanced Biotechnology Center
Center for Higher Education
Center for Crystal Science and Technology
The Institute of Enology and Viticulture
Center for International Education& Office of International Affairs
 Kofu Western Campus (Faculty of Education and Human Science and Faculty of Life and Environmental Science)
The Open University of Japan (Yamanashi Branch)
University Library
Health Service Center
Student Hall
 Campus of the Faculty of Medicine
University Hospital
Universal Center for Medical Analysis and Experiment
Ground of the Faculty of Medicine

Notable alumni
Satoshi Ōmura, biochemist, 2015 Nobel Prize in Physiology or Medicine winner.
Hiroshi Ishiguro, intelligent robotics engineer, Distinguished Professor at Osaka University.

Notes

 The text of "「梨大」とは、山梨大学の愛称です。「山大」とかではありませんので注意してください。" translates to English as "The University of Yamanashi is colloquially called 'Nashidai'. Please note that it is not shortened to 'Yamadai' among others."

References

The partner universities (a part) 
Partners of the University of Yamanashi
  Eastern Kentucky University, USA
  University of Iowa, USA
  Chinese Academy of Sciences, China
  China Institute of Water Resources and Hydropower Research, China
  Tianjin Normal University, China
  Sichuan University, China
  China Medical University, China
  Inner Mongolia Medical University, China
  University of Indonesia (Faculty of Medicine), Indonesia
  Asian Institute of Technology, Thailand
  Khon Kaen University, Thailand
  Durham University, U.K.
  Oxford Brookes University, U.K.
  University of Technology, Australia
  TU Dresden, Germany 
  Technical University of Munich, Germany

Partners of the Faculties

 Partners of Faculty of Education and Human Science
 Ludwigsburg University of Education, Germany
 Jean Moulin University Lyon 3, France
 Partners of Faculty of Engineering
 Hanyang University, Republic of Korea
 Chonbuk National University, Republic of Korea
 Changchun Institute of Applied Chemistry, Chinese Academy of Science, China
 Wuhan University of Technology, China
 Southwest Jiaotong University, China
 Northern Malaysia University, Malaysia 
 Brawijaya University, Indonesia
 Partners of Faculty of Medicine
 Karolinska Institute, Sweden

External links
University of Yamanashi Website

Education in Chūbu region
Education in Yamanashi Prefecture
Japanese national universities
Educational institutions established in 1949
Universities and colleges in Yamanashi Prefecture
1949 establishments in Japan
Kōfu, Yamanashi
Chūō, Yamanashi